Braunstone is a civil parish and is the largest parish within the district of Blaby in Leicestershire, England, now known as the Town of Braunstone or more commonly, Braunstone Town. In 2007 the population was around 15,000. There are around 7,500 households including Thorpe Astley. At the 2011 census the population of the civil parish had increased to 16,850.

Braunstone is mentioned in the Domesday Book of 1086, giving a population of "two sokemen and four villeins". The village remained a small settlement (population 238 in 1921) until 1925 when the Leicester Corporation compulsorily purchased the bulk of the Winstanley Braunstone Hall estate.

It is just outside the city boundary of Leicester, and the part of the old civil parish now inside the city boundary is also called Braunstone. This part of the parish, which contains a large council estate was detached in 1935 from the Blaby district and Braunstone Parish to become part of the county borough of Leicester, hence the present split. The use of the name Braunstone Town is more recent, and is an attempt by Braunstone Town Council to distinguish their village from the council estate of the same name.

Braunstone Town is adjacent to the M1 motorway (junction 21) and is adjoined by the Meridian Business and Leisure Parks, and the Fosse Shopping Park and Grove Triangle retail outlets.

Although the parish doesn't have a railway station of its own, Leicester station is close. Leicester PlusBus, is a scheme where train and bus tickets can be bought together at a saving.

History

The name 'Braunstone' means 'the farm/settlement of Brant'.

The earliest dated human find recorded is a Bronze Age axe (about 1000 BC) found in 1893.

Next came the building of the Roman road from Leicester, through the site of the Narborough Road South to the High Cross near Sharnford. It is also evident that the Vikings of the early or later period had settlements in or near Braunstone, hence the nearby names of Viking origin – Lubbesthorpe, Countesthorpe, Enderby, Elmesthorpe, Cosby, Kilby, Kirby etc. Throughout the above period Braunstone was covered with forest as were most county areas surrounding – in what was known as Leicester Forest. But like most forests these were composed of a series of large woods containing small early settlements or hamlets inter-connected by rough trackways – from which most of our public field paths owe their origin.

Braunstone is mentioned in the Domesday Book (1086 AD) where it is referred to as BRANTESTONE or BRANSTUN

"Braunstone – six plough lands, all but for oxgangs, in Braunstone which is the reign of The Confessor had been valued at twenty shillings, were worth sixty shillings at the general survey and were then held by the son of Robert Burdet. The land was equal to four ploughs, one was in Demesne, and four Bondmen; and two socmen and five villains, with one border, had two ploughs.

Two socmen abiding in Braunstone had five oxgangs of land in Lubbesthorpe; and jointly with ten villains and six borders in that lordship had two ploughs and five ploughing oxen.

The above lands were held by Robert Burdet under Hugh de Grandmesnil, one of William I’s most powerful barons.

Socmen = Scandinavian Villan = Peasant or serf.)

A copy of the Domesday Book is displayed at Braunstone Civic Centre.

The first Lord of the Manor was de Grandmesnil. At this time the village consisted of 8 households and was worth about 60 shillings.

The Harcourt or Horecut family held the over-riding interest in the estate from the 13th to the 16th Century. A survey taken in 1299 showed a growth to 24 households in the village.

The fourteenth century saw several outbreaks of the Black Death in the area. Its effect on Braunstone is not recorded, but nearby Glenfield was seriously affected. At this time the Leicester Forest extended into Braunstone as far as Bendbow Spinney.

Several portions of Braunstone were sold off in the late 16th Century.  of arable land were sold to the Manners family in 1579 and a further  went to the Bennett family ten years later.  of land were converted to pasture in 1596 by the Hastings family who owned the estate at that time.

Woodlands were gradually converted to pastures, mainly for sheep – being then the more profitable husbandry. Leicester Forest was fully enclosed in 1628. Villagers of Braunstone were compensated for the loss of Forestry Rights.

The 18th Century was a period of prosperity for Braunstone. The largest estate of the time was owned by Abraham Compton and comprised 68 ewes, 25 lambs, 14 cows, 6 heifers, 4 calves and 6 pigs.

In 1750 James Winstanley III tried to sink a pit on the manor. His attempts were thwarted when his bore hole was filled with stones by intruders, thought to be from local mining districts.

In the 1820s Braunstone was known as a place to go fox-hunting. Charles Loraine Smith painted a set of parodies known as the "Smoking Hunt" which pokes fun at the fashionable sport of hunting here.

Braunstone remained a village with various tenanted farmsteads until, in 1925, the Leicester Corporation compulsorily purchased the bulk of the Winstanley Braunstone Hall estate for £116,500.

Braunstone’s population rose from 238 in 1921 to 6,997 in 1931.

In 1935 the part of Braunstone on the city side of Braunstone Lane became the North Braunstone Ward of the City of Leicester, and the parish of Braunstone in compensation had part of Lubbesthorpe added to its boundary. It mostly consists of council housing built between 1925 and 1940.

Braunstone Town Council
The Braunstone Town Council is the parish council level local council of the parish of Braunstone Town. The Town Council was established in 1977 when the former parish council resolved to change its status to that of a town council.

The Town Council has 21 elected members (i.e. councillors) who are elected for terms of office of four years.

St Peter's Church

The first record of a church is 1168: the earliest parts of the existing church date from the twelfth or thirteenth century. It is built of limestone and consists of a short square tower, nave and chancel. It was re-roofed in 1867 and had some minor refurbishment in the 20th century. In 1937 Braunstone became a parish in its own right, and St Peter's became the parish church with its own vicar.

Arms

References

External links

Braunstone Town Council
Leicestershire Villages Website
St Peter's Church
Mosaic Church

Braunstone, Leicester
Civil parishes in Leicestershire
Towns in Leicestershire
Blaby